Love Me is a surviving 1918 American drama silent film directed by Roy William Neill and written by C. Gardner Sullivan. The film stars Dorothy Dalton, Jack Holt, William Conklin, Dorcas Matthews, Melbourne MacDowell and Elinor Hancock. The film was released on March 18, 1918, by Paramount Pictures.

Plot

Cast
Dorothy Dalton as Maida Madison
Jack Holt as Gordon Appleby
William Conklin as Rupert Fenton
Dorcas Matthews as Eunice 
Melbourne MacDowell as Grant Appleby
Elinor Hancock as Mrs. Appleby
Robert McKim as Mortimer Appleby

Preservation status
Prints survive in the Library of Congress collection and the Academy Film Archive(Beverly Hills).

References

External links 
 
 

1918 films
1910s English-language films
Silent American drama films
1918 drama films
Paramount Pictures films
Films directed by Roy William Neill
American black-and-white films
American silent feature films
1910s American films